The Young Tigers of Hong Kong (German: Die jungen Tiger von Hongkong) is a 1969 West German action film directed by Ernst Hofbauer and starring Robert Woods, Véronique Vendell and Werner Pochath.

The film's sets were designed by the art director Peter Rothe. Location shooting took place around Hong Kong.

Cast
 Robert Woods as Rodney 
 Véronique Vendell  as Ann 
 Werner Pochath  as Walter 
 Barbara Capell as Christine 
 Jochen Busse  as Carl van Dreegen 
 Solvi Stubing 
 Michael Bulmer
 Las Franzin
 Huk van Es 
 Ralf Wolter  as Bob

References

Bibliography 
 Bergfelder, Tim. International Adventures: German Popular Cinema and European Co-Productions in the 1960s. Berghahn Books, 2005.

External links 
 

1969 films
1960s action films
1960s exploitation films
German action films
West German films
1960s German-language films
Films directed by Ernst Hofbauer
Films set in Hong Kong
Films shot in Hong Kong
1960s German films